Kaspar Rostrup (born 27 April 1940) is a Danish film director. Two of his films won the Best Film prize at the Bodil Awards : Jeppe på bjerget (1981) and Waltzing Regitze (1989). The latter was also nominated for the Academy Award for Best Foreign Language Film. Jeppe på bjerget was entered into the 12th Moscow International Film Festival.

Selected filmography
 Jeppe på bjerget (1981)
 Waltzing Regitze (1989)

References

External links

1940 births
Living people
Danish film directors
People from Frederiksberg
Rostrup family
Kategori:Slægten Rostrup